Dream Part.02 is the fifth extended play by South Korean boy band Astro. It was released by Fantagio Music and distributed by Interpark on November 1, 2017. The EP contains five tracks, including the lead single, "Crazy Sexy Cool".

Background and release 
On October 16, 2017, Fantagio Music announced that Astro will make a comeback with their fifth EP using the name Dream Part.02 on November 1. On October 18, they released the first set of the concept photos for Dream Part.02. On October 20, the second set of the concept photos was released. On October 23 and 25, they released the album tracklist and preview respectively, revealing "Crazy Sexy Cool" as the title track. Five days later, on October 30, the music video teaser for "Crazy Sexy Cool" was released.

On November 1, they released Dream Part.02 along with the music video for "Crazy Sexy Cool".

Track listing

Charts

Release history

References 

2017 EPs
Astro (South Korean band) albums
Interpark Music EPs